Limestone is a locality  in the Shire of Murrindindi, north eastern Victoria, in eastern Australia.

References

Towns in Victoria (Australia)
Shire of Murrindindi